Nebaghia  or Nebaghiya is a village and rural commune in the Trarza Region of south-western Mauritania.

In 2000 it had a population of 8,165.

References

Communes of Trarza Region